This a list of notable former Roman Catholic religious brothers:
 Rick Curry, SJ – was a Jesuit brother for 47 years before being ordained a priest in 2009 at the age of 66
 Justo Gallego Martínez – Spanish former Trappist monk who left due to ill health; best known for his construction of an unfinished and unsanctioned cathedral in the Community of Madrid
 Robert Hoatson – former Christian Brother and priest who left to become a sexual abuse victims activist
 John Philip Holland – Irish engineer and developer of the first submarine of the United States Navy; was a member of the Congregation of Christian Brothers in his younger years before leaving in 1873 due to ill health
 Guillaume Imbert – French writer; was forced by his parents to join a Benedictine monastery but left as soon as he could
 Gabriel Moran – American theologian and religious educator; was a Brother of the Christian Schools from 1954–1985 when he left and married a woman
 Trinidad Sanchez, Jr. – American poet; was a Jesuit brother for 27 years
 William I of Berg – Count of Berg; former monk whose religious vows were absolved by the Pope so he could become count

See also 
 List of former Roman Catholic priests
 List of former Roman Catholic nuns

References

Former brothers